Austroargiolestes isabellae is a species of Australian damselfly in the family Megapodagrionidae,
commonly known as a Sydney flatwing. 
Endemic to the Sydney district, it inhabits streams and boggy areas.

It is a medium-sized to large, black and pale yellow damselfly, often with some pruinescence on adult bodies .
Like other members of the Megapodagrionidae, it rests with its wings outspread.

Gallery

See also
 List of Odonata species of Australia

References 

Megapodagrionidae
Odonata of Australia
Insects of Australia
Endemic fauna of Australia
Taxa named by Günther Theischinger
Taxa named by A.F. (Tony) O'Farrell
Insects described in 1986
Damselflies